Victory Garden is a park in São Lázaro, Macau, China. The park was built to commemorate the victory by the Portuguese over the Dutch in 1622.

The park features a statute commemorating the historic event, a tree, benches and flowers that line the pathways from Avenida de Sidónio Pais.

See also
 List of tourist attractions in Macau

References

Urban public parks in Macau